George Washington Jeske (February 22, 1891 – October 28, 1951) was an American screenwriter, director, and actor.

Career
Jeske was born in Salt Lake City, Utah in 1891. He was one of the original Keystone Kops for Mack Sennett.

He wrote for more than 50 films between 1926 and 1946, including the Torchy film series with Ray Cooke in the title role. He also directed 37 films between 1922 and 1933. He died in Los Angeles, California.

Selected filmography

See also

References

External links 
 

1891 births
1951 deaths
American male screenwriters
American film directors
American male film actors
American male silent film actors
Silent film directors
Male actors from Utah
Writers from Salt Lake City
20th-century American male actors
Screenwriters from Utah
20th-century American male writers
20th-century American screenwriters